Azam Taleghani (1943 – 30 October 2019) was an Iranian politician and journalist who was the head of the Society of Islamic Revolution Women of Iran, editor of Payam-e-Hajar weekly, and a member of the Iranian parliament.

Early life 
Born in Iran, Taleghani was the daughter of Ayatollah Mahmoud Taleghani. She served time in prison during the Pahlavi regime. After the Iranian Revolution she was a member of the Iranian parliament, founded "Jame'e Zanan Mosalman" (Society of Muslim women), and published Payam e Hajar Weekly, an Islamic journal about women and women's rights. In 2003 she protested against the death of Zahra Kazemi. Both in 2001 and 2009, Taleghani submitted her candidacy for Iran's presidential elections, but, like all women's candidacies, her candidacy was rejected by Iran's Guardian Council .

Her political ideals espoused a "progressive brand of revolutionary Islamism."

Electoral history

References

1943 births
2019 deaths
Iranian editors
Iranian women editors
Iranian religious-nationalists
21st-century Iranian women politicians
21st-century Iranian politicians
Iranian women journalists
Iranian women's rights activists
Members of the 1st Islamic Consultative Assembly
Muslim reformers
Office for the Cooperation of the People with the President politicians
Members of the National Council for Peace
Iranian magazine founders